Abbas Ali Khani (also Romanized as ʿAbbās ʿAlī Khānī) is a village in Kakan Rural District, in the Central District of Boyer-Ahmad County, Kohgiluyeh and Boyer-Ahmad Province, Iran. At the 2006 census, its population was 423, in 88 families.

References 

Populated places in Boyer-Ahmad County